The Metropolitan School District of Wayne Township is a school district located in Indianapolis, Indiana, United States, serving Wayne Township in western Marion County. It is known for its high school, Ben Davis, which was founded in 1892. The district also operates 2 seventh and eighth grade centers, one ninth grade center, and 11 elementary schools. Recently, a ninth-grade center was built alongside Ben Davis to address the specific needs of ninth grade students. Currently, the former Fulton Junior High has been renovated and reconstructed and reopened in 2007 as Chapel Hill Seventh and Eighth Grade Center.  The district received a new superintendent, Dr. Jeff Butts, in 2011.

In addition to the many courses available at Ben Davis, there is the Area 31 Career Center that focuses on upper-class students (juniors and seniors). The courses available at the center include everything from computer programming to cosmetics, and help get a jump-start into entering a college course.  Students from 11 high schools in Marion, Hendricks, and Morgan Counties can come to the Career Center at Ben Davis and take courses during the regular school day.  The district also has an extensive adult-education program and has opened Ben Davis University High School, a partnership with Vincennes University.

The school system owns radio station WBDG which is a 400-Watt FM radio station based at Ben Davis High School and operated by the students of BDHS and the Area 31 Career Center.

Schools

Elementary schools
Bridgeport Elementary School 
Chapel Glen Elementary School 
Chapelwood Elementary School 
Garden City Elementary School 
Maplewood Elementary School 
McClelland Elementary School 
North Wayne Elementary School 
Rhoades Elementary School

Robey Elementary School 
Stout Field Elementary School 
Westlake Elementary School 
Elena B Elementary School

Middle schools
Chapel Hill Seventh and Eighth Grade Center
Elena B Seventh and Eighth Grade Center

High schools
Ben Davis Ninth Grade Center 
Ben Davis High School 
Ben Davis University High School (opened fall 2007) 
Area 31 Career Center
Achieve Virtual Education Academy

Other schools
Sanders School 
	Wayne Preparatory Academy formerly Wayne Enrichment Center 
West Central Joint Services

References

External links

Education in Indianapolis
Wayne Township